Kilkelly is a small village in Kilmovee civil parish, County Mayo, Ireland. It is just south of Ireland West Airport Knock on the N17, a national primary road running between Galway and Sligo.

History

Built heritage
Evidence of ancient settlement in the area includes a ringfort site in Liscosker townland. An early ecclesiastical site to the south of Kilkelly village, which includes the remains of a church and graveyard, is historically associated with Saint Celsus (or Cellach). The modern Roman Catholic church of Saint Celsus, to the north of the village, is in the Roman Catholic Diocese of Achonry. Urlaur Abbey, a monastic site dating to the mid-15th century, is also nearby.

Emigration
Kilkelly is the subject of a song. "Kilkelly, Ireland", by the American songwriter Peter Jones. In the 1980s, Jones discovered a collection of 19th century letters sent to his Irish emigrant ancestor in America from that ancestor's father in Kilkelly. Jones wrote a ballad based on the contents of those letters, conveying the experience of his own family as well as others separated by emigration.

Amenities
Kilkelly has a number of shops, a pharmacy, credit union branch, and a post office. As of 2010, the local national (primary) school had over 50 pupils enrolled.

Notable people

George Harrison, IRA member and arms trafficker was born in nearby Shammer.
Dominick Cafferky who was a local farmer and politician for the Clann na Talmhan political party.

See also

 List of towns and villages in Ireland

References

Towns and villages in County Mayo